Big Momma's House 2 is a 2006 American crime comedy film, the sequel to 2000's Big Momma's House and the second installment of the Big Momma film series. The film was directed by John Whitesell and starring Martin Lawrence reprising his role as FBI agent Malcolm Turner, along with Nia Long, Zachary Levi, Mark Moses, Emily Procter, Kat Dennings and Chloë Grace Moretz in supporting roles. Like its predecessor and successor, the film was panned by critics.

Unlike the first film, Big Momma's House 2 takes on a family friendly tone compared to the original film's more mature target demographic.  The film was released theatrically on January 27, 2006, by 20th Century Fox. It was a box office success and grossing $141.5 million against a budget of $40 million. A sequel, Big Mommas: Like Father, Like Son, was released on February 18, 2011.

Plot
Six years after meeting her during an investigation, FBI agent Malcolm Turner is now married to Sherry Pierce and the stepfather of her son Trent, and assumes a desk job to be close to her as they await the arrival of their first child. However, news reaches him that his friend Doug Hudson was killed, while working undercover in Orange County, California. Malcolm learns that Doug was investigating former military intelligence specialist Tom Fuller, who now works for the National Agenda Software corporation, and had discovered he was creating a computer worm that could provide backdoor access to government databases. Although he asks to assist, his boss refuses to let him interfere in the investigation being conducted by agents Liliana Morales and Kevin Keneally. Discovering Morales is sending an agent undercover to secure the job of nanny within Tom's family, Malcolm decides to take advantage of this, lying to Sherry that he must go out-of-state for a conference.

Malcolm reprises his role as Sherry's estranged grandmother Hattie Mae Pierce - known affectionately as Big Momma - and secures the nanny job by exposing flaws in the other candidates. While he keeps his eyes on Tom, Malcolm learns that the Fuller family has problems: Tom's wife Leah is very strict on chores; eldest daughter Molly seeks to be someone she is not; youngest daughter Carrie strives to do well as a cheerleader; and toddler son Andrew has a habit of jumping off of tall objects. Although he finds evidence that Tom is working alongside a notorious hacker, Sherry tracks him down after discovering he lied to her and is heartbroken to discover he is working on a case. The matter is then made worse when Morales discover him interfering in her case, and allows him to assist as long as he maintains his cover and retains Kevin as his partner. After Leah threatens to fire Big Momma for her handling of her chores, Malcolm spends the night cleaning the house to win back her favor.

After an attempt to capture the hacker fails, Malcolm and Kevin recruit assistance from child hacker Stewart to access Fuller's workstation at Agenda. While they secure the means, Malcolm receives a call from a frightened Molly at a nightclub, and goes to find her as Big Momma. Soon after, men working for Agenda's CEO Anthony Bishop take both of them hostage in order to coerce Tom to assist in a business deal involving the computer worm. Malcolm soon frees the pair before going to rescue Tom, while Molly calls for the FBI. Discovering that Bishop plans to kill Tom as part of the deal he made with his customer, Malcolm saves his life and ensures Bishop cannot escape before the FBI arrives. Although shocked to discover Malcolm's real identity, Tom is thankful to him when he informs Morales that he was being coerced by his boss under the threat of having his family killed for refusing.

While the case is ended and he has made amends with Sherry, Malcolm decides stay in California and maintain his cover in order to assist Carrie, after helping her team improve themselves for an upcoming cheerleading championships. Helping them to successfully win, Malcolm eventually departs, leaving behind a letter from Big Momma explaining to the Fullers to enjoy their time together. He returns home to reunite with Sherry, Trent, and their newly born son named Doug.

Cast

 Martin Lawrence as Malcolm Turner / Hattie Mae 'Big Momma' Pierce
 Nia Long as Sherry Pierce-Turner
 Zachary Levi as Agent Kevin Keneally
 Mark Moses as Tom Fuller
 Emily Procter as Leah Fuller
 Kat Dennings as Molly Fuller
 Chloë Grace Moretz as Carrie Fuller
 Preston Shores, Trevor Shores as Andrew Fuller
 Marisol Nichols as Agent Liliana Morales
 Jascha Washington as Trent Pierce
 Sarah Joy Brown as Agent Constance Stone
 Kevin Durand as Oshima
 Cameron Daddo as Casal
 Christopher Jones as Anthony Bishop
 Josh Flitter as Stewart
 Max Van Ville as Chad
 Rhoda Griffis as Mrs. Gallagher
 Kirk B.R. Woller as Doug Hudson
 Ann Mahoney as Coach Lisa
 Shanna Moakler as Petra
 Andy Stahl as School's Principal
 Lisa Arrindell as Danielle
 Jessica White as Bra Model
 Paige Butcher as Background Model #1

Reception

Box office 
Big Momma's House 2 grossed $27,736,056 in its opening weekend ranking number one. As of March 3, 2011, the film has grossed a total of $70,165,972 at the United States box office with a worldwide gross of $138,259,062.

Critical response 
On Rotten Tomatoes, the film has an approval rating of 5% based on 74 reviews and an average rating of 3/10. The site's critical consensus reads: "Unfunny and unoriginal. In other words, a perfect piece of evidence for opponents of pointless movie sequels". On Metacritic, the film has a score of 34 out of 100 based on 20 critics, indicating "generally unfavorable reviews". Audiences polled by CinemaScore gave the film an average grade of "A−" on an A+ to F scale.

Brian Lowry of Variety called the film "episodic" and "flat" compared to the original film.

Keith Uhlich of Slant Magazine gave the film 1⁄2 out of 4 stars.

The film was nominated for a Golden Raspberry Awards in 2006  in the category "Worst Prequel or Sequel", but lost to Basic Instinct 2.

Its poor reception has been lampooned in The Onion.

Sequel 

A third and final installment Big Mommas: Like Father, Like Son was released on February 18, 2011. Brandon T. Jackson was cast in the role of Trent, who was originally played by Jascha Washington. Nia Long also did not reprise her role, which resulted in her character, Sherry, being written out. Big Mommas: Like Father, Like Son fared worse to negative critical reception than its predecessors, scoring a 5% on Rotten Tomatoes.

References

External links

 
 

20th Century Fox films
2000s crime comedy films
2006 films
2000s police comedy films
Cross-dressing in American films
2000s English-language films
Films set in California
Films shot in New Orleans
Regency Enterprises films
American sequel films
Films directed by John Whitesell
Films scored by George S. Clinton
American crime comedy films
2006 comedy films
2000s American films
African-American films